Jessie Aitken (née Fraser; 14 April 1867 – 18 January 1934) was a New Zealand community worker and political activist. She was born in Ecclesmachan, West Lothian, Scotland, on 14 April 1867.

References

1867 births
1934 deaths
New Zealand Labour Party politicians
New Zealand social workers
New Zealand activists
New Zealand women activists
Scottish emigrants to New Zealand
Social Democratic Party (New Zealand) politicians
Wellington Hospital Board members